The Evangelical Baptist Mission of South Haiti is a Baptist Christian denomination in Haiti, headquartered in Les Cayes. MEBSH is a member of the Protestant Federation of Haiti, the Evangelical Council of Haitian Churches and the Baptist World Alliance.

History
Evangelical Baptist Mission of South Haiti (MEBSH) began with the evangelistic efforts of repatriated Haitians from Cuba in the 1920s. The organization was officially formed in 1936 in Les Cayes when the movement's leaders invited the non-denominational agency World Team (then West Indies Mission) to open a Bible school.

In 1958, the Mission founded Radio Lumière in Les Cayes.

In 1993, the Light University was founded by the Mission.

Since 2012 the president of the Evangelical Baptist Mission of South Haiti is Rev. Alnève Emile, who succeeded Rev. Luders Erase for a five-year term.  He was re-elected in 2017.

According to a denomination census released in 2020, it claimed 488 churches and 60,000 members.

Social work 
The MEBSH operates numerous educational, health and development institutions in Haiti.

Schools
It has 413 primary schools and secondary schools. 

It also has 1 professional training institute. 

It has 3 affiliated theological institutes.

Health Services 
It manages the Lumière Hospital in Bonne Fin and the Lumière Health Center in Les Cayes.

Development 
 Women's domestic training center:  Centre Lumière aux Cayes
 Integrated Rural Development
 Well drilling
 Orphanages
 Youth Camp Mahanaim

See also
 Bible
 Born again
 Baptist beliefs
 Worship service (evangelicalism)
 Jesus Christ
 Believers' Church

References

External links
 Official Website

Baptist Christianity in Haiti
Christian organizations established in 1936
Baptist denominations in the Caribbean
Baptist denominations established in the 20th century